The men's road race at the 1929 UCI Road World Championships was the third edition of the event. The race took place on Friday 16 August 1929 in Zürich, Switzerland. The race was won by Georges Ronsse of Belgium.

Final classification

References

Men's Road Race
UCI Road World Championships – Men's road race